Sarki may refer to:

Sarki, a well-dwelling snake slain by the mythological prince Bayajidda
Şarkı, a vocal genre in Ottoman classical music
Sarki (ethnic group), a sub group of Khas community
Sarki, Hausa title for a traditional ruler or chief